WZSP (105.3 MHz "La Zeta 105.3") is a commercial FM radio station licensed to Nocatee, Florida, serving De Soto County and Arcadia.  It is owned by Solmart Media, LLC, headed by Tomas Martinez and Mercedes Soler.  WZSP broadcasts a Regional Mexican radio format from studios and offices in Sarasota.

WZSP has an effective radiated power (ERP) of 4,100 watts.  The transmitter is on Addison Avenue in Arcadia.

References

External links
Station website

ZSP